Old Scone mercat cross (also known as Old Scone market cross) is the sole remnant of the ancient Scottish town of Old Scone, which was dissolved in 1803–1804 upon the development of today's New Scone.

Now in the grounds of Scone Palace, albeit a few yards south of its original location, it was erected sometime in the late Middle Ages and is now a Category A listed structure.

The cross has an octagonal shaft with a moulded capital and foliated cross. Other fragments sit at its base.

Gallery

See also
Mercat cross

References

External links
A view of the cross and the carriage road for which it was moved a few yards – Gazetteer for Scotland

Category A listed buildings in Perth and Kinross
Scotland in the Late Middle Ages
Monumental crosses in Scotland